Aliabad-e Sasal (، also Romanized as ‘Alīābād-e Sāsal; also known as ‘Alīābād and Sāsal) is a village in Sharwineh Rural District, Kalashi District, Javanrud County, Kermanshah Province, Iran. At the 2006 census, its population was 249, in 60 families.

References 

Populated places in Javanrud County